This is a list of Morgan State Bears football players in the NFL Draft.

Key

Selections

References

Morgan State

Morgan State Bears NFL Draft